USS Cisco (SS-290), a Balao-class submarine, was the only ship of the United States Navy to be named for the cisco, a whitefish of the Great Lakes. Her keel was laid down by the Portsmouth Navy Yard in Kittery, Maine. She was launched on 24 December 1942 sponsored by Mrs. A. C. Bennett, through her proxy, Mrs. N. Robertson, and commissioned on 10 May 1943 with Commander James W. Coe in command. She reported to the Pacific Fleet.

Cisco sailed from Panama 7 August 1943 for Brisbane, Australia, arriving 1 September to assume local patrol duties, until 18 September, when she docked at Darwin. She put out on her first war patrol 20 September, but never returned. Japanese records tell of sighting a submarine leaking oil on 28 September in an area where Cisco is known to have been the only submarine then operating. Japanese records state this submarine was sunk by bombs and depth charges. Japanese records state that the submarine was attacked by Type 97 "Kate" attack bombers of the 954 Naval Air Squadron and the riverboat Karatsu (originally the U.S. Navy gunboat , captured by Japanese forces and put to work against her former owners). Cisco is thus presumed to have been lost in action 28 September 1943. The only survivor from the crew was Chief Radioman Howell B. Rice (USN ret.), who was taken sick in Darwin and sent ashore to the Navy hospital prior to Cisco's final voyage.

References

External links 

On Eternal Patrol: USS Cisco
Obituary of Howell Barbee Rice (1917–2011), sole survivor of the USS Cisco

Balao-class submarines
World War II submarines of the United States
Lost submarines of the United States
World War II shipwrecks in the South China Sea
Ships built in Kittery, Maine
1942 ships
Maritime incidents in September 1943
Submarines sunk by aircraft
Ships sunk by Japanese aircraft
Submarines sunk by Japanese warships
Shipwrecks of the Philippines